Carlos Saurí (born 21 June 1974) is a Puerto Rican weightlifter. He competed in the men's middleweight event at the 2000 Summer Olympics.

References

1974 births
Living people
Puerto Rican male weightlifters
Olympic weightlifters of Puerto Rico
Weightlifters at the 2000 Summer Olympics
Place of birth missing (living people)